Misapata may refer to:

 Misapata (Cabana), a mountain in the Andes of Peru
 Misapata (Cabana-Lucanas), a mountain in the Andes of Peru